Nemophora molella is a moth of the Adelidae family. It is found in France, Hungary, Romania and Russia.

References

External links
lepiforum.de

Moths described in 1816
Adelidae
Moths of Europe